Tony Tripoli (born December 2, 1969) is an American actor, host, comedian and LGBT rights activist from Los Angeles, California.

Biography

Early life
Tony Tripoli was born on December 2, 1969, in Phoenix, Arizona.

Career
He is the Co-Executive Producer and head writer of E!'s hit show Fashion Police, with Joan Rivers. He has been a producer on Joan and Melissa: Joan Knows Best?, where he was also a cast member. He produced also In Bed with Joan, What She Said, and Good Work. Previously, he was a staff writer on The Dish on Style Network. He has appeared on television shows such as Kathy Griffin: My Life on the D-List, Fashion House and Two and a Half Men. Other credits include Joan and Melissa: Joan Knows Best?, TV Guide's Funniest Commercials, TV Guides Hollywood's Sexiest Couples, Gossip Queens, Frank TV, Pretty Hurts, and E!'s 50 Super Epic TV Moments.

He performs his stand-up comedy throughout the United States and opened for Joan Rivers for 4 years. He discusses a number of topics in his standup ranging from sex and dating to his family and pop culture. After her death, Tony began touring a tribute show called "The Bitch Is Back", featuring Joan Rivers impersonator Joe Posa.

Personal life
He is openly gay. His dog, Bingham, is a main fixture in his Facebook posts.

External links

Official site

1969 births
Living people
American gay actors
American male television actors
American LGBT broadcasters
American LGBT rights activists
LGBT people from Arizona